Antennatus is a genus of frogfishes. The last species was described in 2001.

Species
There are currently twelve recognized species in this genus:
 Antennatus analis L. P. Schultz, 1957 (Tailjet frogfish)
 Antennatus bermudensis L. P. Schultz, 1957 (Island frogfish)
 Antennatus coccineus Lesson, 1831 (Scarlet frogfish)
 Antennatus dorehensis Bleeker, 1859 (New Guinean frogfish)
 Antennatus duescus (Snyder, 1904) (Side-jet frogfish)
 Antennatus flagellatus Ohnishi, Iwata & Hiramatsu, 1997 (Whip frogfish)
 Antennatus linearis J. E. Randall & Holcom, 2001 (Pygmy Anglerfish)
 Antennatus nummifer G. Cuvier, 1817 (Spotfin frogfish)
 Antennatus rosaceus H. M. Smith & Radcliffe, 1912 (Spiny-tufted frogfish)
 Antennatus sanguineus T. N. Gill, 1863 (Bloody frogfish)
 Antennatus strigatus T. N. Gill, 1863 (Bandtail frogfish)
 Antennatus tuberosus G. Cuvier, 1817 (Tuberculated frogfish)

References

Antennariidae
Marine fish genera
Taxa named by Leonard Peter Schultz